The following highways are numbered 18C:

United States
  Nebraska Spur 18C
  New York State Route 18C (former)
  County Route 18C (Otsego County, New York)

See also
 List of highways numbered 18